Willibald Hahn (31 January 1910 – 31 May 1999) was an Austrian footballer and football manager.

Career
Hahn played for Florisdorfer AC, Austria Wien, SC de la Bastiedienne Bordeaux, Favoritner Sportclub, Favoritner AC and Admira Wien.

Coaching career
He began his coaching career with Moss FK in Norway and went on to coach the national team. He then coached, Bayern Munich, Switzerland, KSV Hessen Kassel, Schwarz-Weiß Essen, Rot-Weiß Oberhausen, ESV Ingolstadt, SpVgg Bayreuth, SSV Reutlingen and Stuttgarter Kickers.

He won the German Cup of 1957 with Bayern Munich.

References

Profile
Biographical information on Willibald Hahn 

1910 births
1999 deaths
Austrian footballers
Austrian football managers
FK Austria Wien players
Ligue 2 players
Norway national football team managers
Vålerenga Fotball managers
FC Bayern Munich managers
Switzerland national football team managers
Footballers from Vienna
KSV Hessen Kassel managers
Schwarz-Weiß Essen managers
Stuttgarter Kickers managers
Association football midfielders